Wurdeman & Becket was an architectural firm, a partnership of Walter Wurdeman, Welton Becket and Charles F. Plummer.  The Moderne Pan-Pacific Auditorium, dating from 1935, brought them local fame.

Besides those works ascribed to Mr. Wurdemann and Mr. Becket as individuals, those ascribed to the firm include:
Bullock's Pasadena
Bullock's Palm Springs
General Petroleum Building
Jones Dog & Cat Hospital Building
Museum Square
Panorama City, Los Angeles - master plan
The Post-war House

References

Defunct architecture firms based in California
1935 establishments in California
1949 disestablishments in California
Defunct companies based in Greater Los Angeles
Modernist architects from the United States
Streamline Moderne architecture in California
Modernist architecture in California